Patrick Salameh (born April 21, 1957), known as The Marseille Ripper, is a French criminal and serial killer.

Between May and November 2008, in Marseille, many women disappeared without leaving a trace. Despite the efforts of scientists, no body has been found. A key witness will come and relaunch the investigation by affirming that Patrick Salameh is the author of these disappearances. When Patrick Salameh finds himself involved in these disappearances, investigators will discover his heavy judicial past, directly overwhelming him.

He will be sentenced, in April 2014 and October 2015 (at first instance) and then in May 2016 (on appeal), to life imprisonment, with a safety period of 22 years for kidnapping, forcible confinement, and rape resulting in dead.

Biography

Origin 
Patrick Salameh was born on April 21, 1957 in Fréjus in the Var. He comes from a large family of Lebanese-Syrian origin, made up of 9 brothers and sisters. When Patrick was a child, the Salamehs moved to the Marseille region. The childhood of Patrick Salameh unfolds, according to himself, as being a "paradise populated by locusts and butterflies".

In the early 1980s, when he was barely 25 years old, Patrick Salameh became manager of a restaurant, the “Rock Opéra Burger”, located in the heart of the sensitive districts of Marseille.

In 1983, Patrick Salameh married and became the father of two children. 
In 1988, however, Patrick Salameh saw his income suddenly fall and his restaurant went bankrupt.

Series of armed attacks 
Between September 1988 and February 1989, Patrick Salameh and a group of friends carried out numerous burglaries and robberies. They are rampant in the Var region. They break into private homes, attack them and steal their fortune. They will be nicknamed "The Wild Horde" in the press and in the media. During the robberies of the gang, Patrick Salameh is nicknamed "Antoine". This series of armed robberies is made up of five heists, two of which are made up of aggravated violence, which will give the gang aggravating circumstances:

 On December 9, 1988, during the third armed attack committed by "The Wild Horde", the husband was severely beaten while his wife suffered physical abuse imposed by Patrick Salameh by his associates.
 On February 28, 1989, during the fifth and last gang robbery, Patrick Salameh and his associates sequester a close relative of the Zampa family, a former figure in the Marseilles environment, and steal a large sum of money from him. This attack was then very publicized, because many police officers were mobilized and made it possible to identify the perpetrators.

Arrest, preventive detention and escape attempts 
At the beginning of March 1989, Patrick Salameh and his associates were arrested and imprisoned in the Baumettes prison. In preventive prison, Patrick Salameh is accused by his accomplices of being the author of the violence, but Salameh denies having committed these offenses. 

During the night of July 26 to 27, 1990, Patrick Salameh tries to escape from prison, by giving sleeping pills to his fellow prisoner. Then, he baits one of his guards by promising to give 15,000 francs, on condition that the latter “close his eyes”. Having no fear in Salameh, the guard listens to him and Salameh runs to the window of his cell, trying to saw through the bars. Salameh then tries to climb the perimeter wall with a mountaineer's rope, 26 meters long and weighted with a bag of putty. Startled, he fell and broke his leg. Salameh was then transferred to Conception Hospital and recovered from his injuries.

In November 1990, while Patrick Salameh began a second escape attempt from the Baumettes prison, a search in his room at the hospital center led to the discovery of a file hidden in a rod and a woven sheet of 2, 50 m. The preventive detention of Patrick Salameh and his associates lasts more than four years, before the opening of the trial of "The Wild Horde".

Trial, conviction, detention and release

On May 10, 1993, the trial of "La Horde Sauvage" began before the Draguignan Assize Court. 36-year-old Patrick Salameh appears accompanied by his three companions. At the end of a week of trial, the jurors deliberate for four hours to determine the sentences of the four accused. During requisitions, the Advocate General requires 20 years of criminal imprisonment against Patrick Salameh.

On May 15, 1993, Patrick Salameh was sentenced to 20 years' imprisonment for armed robbery, forcible confinement, torture and indecent assault.
Released in March 1999, his first requests for release were refused between 1999 and 2004.

In July 2005, Patrick Salameh was released from prison after more than 16 years of detention.

Case summary

Victims
In 2008, in the span of a little more than a month, three prostitutes mysteriously disappeared in Marseille. They were the following:

 Iryna Sytnyk (42) - Ukrainian. Disappeared on the evening of October 5, 2008.
 Cristina Bahulea (23) - Romanian. Vanished without a trace two weeks after Sytnyk, on October 22, 2008.
 Zineb Chebout (28) - Algerian. Left her house to visit a fair on the evening of November 7, 2008, but never returned.

The key witness
The investigators suspected early on that a serial killer was rampant in Marseille, as he kidnapped and killed victims fitting the same profile - foreign prostitutes. However, they had no clues, and no potential suspects.

However, a revelation soon disrupted the course of investigation. A Moroccan prostitute, Soumia El Kandadi, named a man whom she suspected could be responsible for the killings - Patrick Salameh, who on the night of October 5–6, abducted and raped her in his home. When he finished with her, El Kandadi noticed that a lifeless body lied in her attacker's bathtub, with Salameh informing her that "this is the fate [he reserves] for women who don't obey [him]."

Soumia's statements put investigators on the trail for Salameh. Soon after, another clue reinforced their suspicions. The telephone of one of the prostitutes continued to transmit a signal after her disappearance. The police located the signal's source in Marseille: it was a child, which claimed to have been given a SIM card by a certain Patrick Salameh.

Patrick Salameh took his victims' SIM cards and later gave them away, a technique which made the police believe that the missing were still alive, since their telephone numbers continued to emit a localizable signal.

The search
The investigators, in an attempt to locate the bodies, searched Salameh's residency in Saint-Mitre, in Marseille's northern districts. They were aided by Soumia, whom guided them to the place where she had seen the corpse of a woman, leading them to Salameh's studio apartment adjacent to his main home. Although investigators couldn't find any bodies, they found DNA from all three missing women, as well as some of their personal possessions such as jewelry and underwear. Prostitutes often frequented the apartment, but no traces of blood were discovered.

During the pre-trial hearings, Salameh denied killing the prostitutes and remained silent. The bodies were never recovered.

Link to previous case
The investigators, whom wondered if there were other possible victims, expanded their search for any women fitting their criteria. Eventually, they linked Salameh to the disappearance of 20-year-old Fatima Saiah, a student who had vanished a few months earlier from the main murder series. Unlike the victims that followed, she was not a prostitute.

Saiah had published an offer online as a babysitter, and was later contacted by a divorced man on Saturday afternoon, May 7. The two met at 3 PM, at the Malpassé Metro. The man refused to tell his name, but specified that his wife would pick Saiah up in a grey Volkswagen at the metro's exit, which was not far from Salameh's studio apartment.

Initially, Saiah's boyfriend accompanied her to the scene, but later left shortly before she met with the man, agreeing to message each other in a few hours. Two hours later, he received a strange text message saying "I met an old friend, I will be back this weekend." Finding this suspicious, the boyfriend started worrying and tried to contact Saiah, but failed, as her phone had been turned off. The next day, both Saiah's family and boyfriend went to the police station to report her disappearance.

The investigators later traced the phone call Saiah had received for the babysitting offer. It had been made from a telephone booth at Gare de Marseille-Saint-Charles, but that was the only lead they had in the case. A homeless person who was questioned during the investigation later recalled that on that day, he recognized the man using the phone booth as Patrick Salameh.

Arrest
On the evening of November 15, 2008, investigators arrested Patrick Salameh, their only suspect. After his arrest, no more worrying disappearances will be reported in Marseille. He then returns to prison, for the murders of three prostitutes, although little evidence allows to establish a certain guilt towards him. Patrick Salameh's past will not work in his favor since he is a convict.

On March 11, 2009, a reconstitution takes place, but Patrick Salameh, denying the facts with which he is accused, refuses to collaborate. Following this unsuccessful reenactment, Salameh returns to prison.

On May 6, 2011, Patrick Salameh, already charged with the three murders of prostitutes, was again indicted for the alleged murder of Fatima Saiah, whose body was also not found.

On October 12, 2012, Patrick Salameh was referred to the Aix-en-Provence Assize Court for the murders of Iryna Sytnyk, Cristina Bahulea and Zineb Chebout (perpetrated between October and November 2008). He is also the subject of a referral to the Assize Court of Bouches-du-Rhône, for the murder of Fatima Saiah, three weeks before his first trial, on February 24, 2014.

The trial 
Patrick Salameh's first trial began on March 17, 2014, at the Aix-en-Provence Assize Court.

On April 3, 2014, Patrick Salameh was sentenced to life imprisonment, with a safety period of 22 years. He is found guilty of kidnapping, kidnapping, rape followed by death on the person of Iryna Sytnyk, Cristina Bahulea and Zineb Chebout. He is also on trial for the kidnapping and rape of Soumia El Kandadi, the main witness whose testimony led to the arrest of Patrick Salameh. He is appealing this decision.

On October 12, 2015, his second trial began, before the Assize Court of Bouches-du-Rhône. Patrick Salameh is on trial for the kidnapping followed by the death of Fatima Saiah, a young high school student, whose body has never been found.

On October 22, 2015, Patrick Salameh was also sentenced to life imprisonment, with a safety period of 22 years. He is also appealing this decision. The two trials of Salameh being extremely close, the appeal of the two convictions will be joined, thereafter, in a single trial.

On April 18, 2016, Patrick Salameh was tried on appeal, before the Var Assize Court. He was 59 years old at the time. Incarcerated for 7 years and 5 months, Patrick Salameh still denies the four assassinations with which he is accused, whose bodies have never been found. Here again, Salameh is described as "dangerous" and "difficult to cure", with a very high risk of recurrence.

On May 19, 2016, Patrick Salameh was again convicted of the murders of Fatima Saiah, Iryna Sytnyk, Cristina Bahulea and Zineb Chebout (whose bodies were not found) as well as of the rape of Soumia (the five acts having been committed between May and November 2008). Following the deliberations, Salameh is again sentenced to life imprisonment, with a 22-year safety period.

Partick Salameh and his lawyers appeal on points of law, but the appeal is dismissed on July 11, 2017.

See also 
 List of serial killers by country

References

Citations

Bibliography 
 Patrick Salameh, The Marseille Disappearances - The Three Prostitutes, Auto-Edition, Marseille, 2015 (1230000499958).
 Patrick Salameh, The Marseille Disappearances - The Fatima Case, Auto-Edition, Marseille, 2015 (1230000643757).
 Stéphane Bourgoin, Killers - The murderers who marked history, Points, Paris, 2012 (275782810X).
 Véronique Chalmet, In the minds of killers. Profilers' Portraits, Point, Paris, 2015 (2757856316).

External links 
 Court decision on life sentence
 The defense lawyer's arguments
 Salameh's artworks

1957 births
20th-century French criminals
French people convicted of murder
French people convicted of rape
French people of Lebanese descent
French people of Syrian descent
French rapists
French serial killers
Kidnappers
Living people
Male serial killers
Murder convictions without a body
People convicted of assault
People convicted of burglary
People convicted of robbery
People from Fréjus
Prisoners and detainees of France
Prisoners sentenced to life imprisonment by France